Drag or Gas Food Lodging is the debut extended play by Australian rock band, Drag, which was released in June 2002 via Dew Process/Universal Music Australia. The track, "Take Me with You", received airplay on Triple J radio after the EP was released.

The EP reached No. 19 on the ARIA Alternative Albums Chart and No. 6 on the ARIA Hitseekers Albums Chart. The group's founding guitarist and lead vocalist, Darren Middleton, later explained how the group's work was "universally themed and full of obscure metaphors that don't really mean anything, which is what I really did with Drag. There wasn't really any focus in that project."

Track listing
 "Nowhere but Here" – 4:55
 "Secret Design" – 3:26
 "H" – 0:07
 "Take Me with You" – 4:07
 "The Less You Know" – 3:43
 "Thanks for Your Time" – 2:52
 "On Top of It" – 3:05

Personnel
Darren Middleton – guitars, vocals
Mark McElligott – drums, backing vocals
Sean Hartman – bass guitar
Matt Murphy – Wurlitzer piano, Hammond organ
Wayne Connolly – backing vocals
Calib James – strings (on "Secret Design")

References 

2002 debut EPs
Drag (band) albums
Dew Process albums